Sant Gregori is a village in the province of Girona, an autonomous community of Catalonia, Spain.

Sant Gregori was also the site of the 2019 Active Methodology course, delivered at Institut Vall de Llémena from July 1–5.

References

External links
 Government data pages 

Municipalities in Gironès